Lee Milner (born 26 February 1977) is a former Scotland international rugby league footballer who played in the 1990s.

International honours
Lee Milner won a cap for Scotland while at Huddersfield Giants, and was man of the match in the 26-6 victory over Ireland at Firhill Stadium, Glasgow on Tuesday 6 August 1996. Lee Milner was a Great Britain academy Oceania tourist of New Zealand in 1996.

References

External links
Scots take their revenge

1977 births
Living people
English people of Scottish descent
English rugby league players
Halifax R.L.F.C. players
Huddersfield Giants players
Place of birth missing (living people)
Rugby league second-rows
Scotland national rugby league team players